G R Damodaran (20 February 1914 – 1986) was an educationist, an administrator, and founder of The GRD Trust in Coimbatore. He was the founder of PSG College of Technology and founder principal of PSG College of Arts and Science. Dr. G R Damodaran held positions of leadership and served education in a wide range of field and sectors. He was the chairman of the Southern Regional Committee of the AICTE and chairman of the Govt. of India's High Power Committee on the Reorganisation of Polytechnic Education (1969–1970). He was the vice-chancellor of the Madras University. He served as a Member of Parliament and of the Legislative Council of Tamil Nadu.

Early life and education
Damodaran was born to Divan Bahadur P S G Rangaswamy Naidu and Krishnammal on 20 February 1914. His schooling began in an elementary school in Peelamedu; he continued his education at Sarvajana High School, established by the PSG Charity Trust. His intermediate studies were at Government Arts College, Coimbatore in Mathematics. He completed a B.Sc (Electrical Engineering) and B.Sc (Mechanical Engineering) in King's College, New Castle on Tyne, United Kingdom.

Career
In 1943, Damodaran joined the PSG Industrial Institute. In 1948, he started a Tamil monthly magazine Kalaikathir, devoted to science and technology. It installed a Heidelberg printing machine and computerized photo typesetting machine. He was the founder of PSG College of Technology and founder principal of PSG College of Arts and Science.

He served UNESCO International Committee on training abroad policies, the All India Council for Technical Education, National Council for Vocational Trades and the All India Board of Technicians Education.

He was a member of the Syndicate of the Madras University for 33 years. There he introduced far-reaching changes in the engineering curriculum.

His unswerving commitment to the cause of the rural and urban masses through the NSS and Social Service League which he founded was laudable.

In 1952, he served as a Member of Parliament in Pollachi, Lok Sabha constituency. He was elected to the Legislative Council of Tamil Nadu from the Teachers Constituency and once from the Graduate Constituency. In 1955, he organized adult literacy workshop at Coimbatore.

His stint in politics brought him close to stalwarts like K. Kamaraj, C. Subramanian, R. Venkataraman, Dr. V K R V Rao, Prof. N G Ranga, T T Krishnamachari, Dr. Triguna Sen and others.

Vision
Dr G R Damodaran, believed education as the better means for securing the nation's economic future and social well-being, He often defined and addressed education as:
"Education deals with the human growth in mind, spirit, character and effective behavior. The habits and attitudes a student acquires, the interest that cultivates, the ideals that is learned to practice - All these becomes the basic for an individual's future growth and the basics to the prosperity of our Nation."

It is taken as the guiding principle of Dr G R Damodaran College of Science, a college posthumously established in 1988 to honour Dr. G. R. Damodaran.

Contributions
The English books titled The Teacher in You and Evaluation and Grading were written by him. 
He wrote a Tamil book titled Electron. ,
His speeches made were published in a book titled Listen to a Leader in Education. 
He contributed to a dictionary of technical terms that was translated from English to Tamil, Kalaichol Agarathi.

See also
 Dr G R Damodaran College of Science
 PSG College of Technology
 PSG College of Arts and Science

References 

1914 births
1986 deaths
20th-century Indian educational theorists
People from Coimbatore